Notomithrax is a genus of crabs of the family Majidae, containing four species:
 Notomithrax minor (Filhol, 1885)
 Notomithrax spinosus (H. Milne-Edwards, 1834)
 Notomithrax peronii (Miers, 1879)
 Notomithrax ursus (Herbst, 1788)

References

Majoidea